Sri Ramakrishna Mission Vidyalaya College of Arts and Science, is a general degree college located at Coimbatore, Tamil Nadu. The college is affiliated with Bharathiar University. This college offers different courses in arts, commerce and science.

Departments

Science
Mathematics
Physics
Chemistry
Computer Science
Electronics
Information Technology

Arts and Commerce
Tamil
English
Social Work
Physical Education
Commerce
 Commerce with Computer Applications

Accreditation
The college is  recognized by the University Grants Commission (UGC).

References

External links
https://srmvcas.edu.in/

Colleges affiliated to Bharathiar University
Academic institutions formerly affiliated with the University of Madras